Clayton Riggs Ladine is an American-French professional basketball player for Breiðablik of the Úrvalsdeild karla. He played college basketball for Skyline College and Rocky Mountain College before turning professional in 2020.

High School career
Ladine played basketball for Phillip & Sala Burton High School where he averaged 32.3 points in two seasons.

College career
Ladine started his college career with Skyline College, a junior college in San Bruno, California, where he playe two seasons. In 2018, he transferred to Rocky Mountain College where he averaged 13.6 points, 6.1 rebounds and 5.3 assists during his senior season.

Professional career
In December 2020, Ladine signed with Sorgues BC of the French Nationale Masculine 2 (NM2). In July 2021, Ladine signed with Hrunamenn of the Icelandic 1. deild karla. On 24 March 2022, he scored a season high 40 points in a victory against Hamar. For the season, he averaged 23.9 points, 5.9 rebounds and league leading 8.1 assists per game.

The following season, Ladine signed with Breiðablik of the Icelandic Úrvalsdeild karla. In hist first Úrvalsdeild game, he had 20 points, 7 rebounds and 8 assists in a win against Þór Þorlákshöfn.

Personal life
Ladine's sister is basketball player Elle Ladine.

References

External links
Icelandic statistics at Icelandic Basketball Association
Profile at Eurobasket.com

1998 births
Living people
American expatriate basketball people in Iceland
French expatriate basketball people in Iceland
American men's basketball players
French men's basketball players
Breiðablik men's basketball players
Rocky Mountain College alumni
Hamar men's basketball players
Point guards
Úrvalsdeild karla (basketball) players
Junior college men's basketball players in the United States